The Craver Farmstead was established circa 1790 consisting of 225 acres with a farmhouse and a barn. Today, the Craver Farmstead is both architecturally and historically significant. The farmhouse was built prior to 1790 and stands as one of the oldest and best preserved examples of Federal-style architecture in upstate New
York. The Federal style evolved as the dominant classicizing architecture in North America between 1780 and1830 as the new republic of the United States sought to define itself as independent in literature, art, and architecture just as it was politically.

Craver Farmstead is located on Craver Road in southern Rensselaer County, New York at the northeast corner of the town of East Greenbush, NY near the hamlet of West Sand Lake, NY. The one-mile county road bearing the site's name ("Craver Road") stretches across the original historic site to connect two more recently developed roadways. Historians agree that Craver Road was at first simply a horse trail leading to the then-new farmhouse during the mid-to-late 18th century. Soon afterward, Craver Road became a personal carriageway for the Craver Family as one may think of the modern driveway. The barn located at Craver Farmstead originally served as a private draft horse stable and carriage house for the exclusive use of the Craver family far prior to the advent of the horseless carriage.

Historically, the Craver Farmstead represents the agricultural heritage of 18th and 19th century rural New York. It serves as a landmark of the region's agrarian past as well as a tangible link to the hardy folks who settled upstate New York.

The Craver Farmstead is listed on the National Register of Historic Places as certified by the U.S. Department of the Interior.

Farmhouse 
The Craver
farmhouse is a fine vernacular example of the Federal style of
architecture.  The Craver farmhouse also provides
a rich historical example of the type of home in which generation after
generation of upstate New York farmers resided and reared their families and retains
a high degree of integrity of location, feeling, association, materials, and
craftsmanship.

In the spirit
of Federal-style architecture, the Craver farmhouse is characterized by balance
and symmetry in design, lightness and elegance in mood, and delicacy and
finesse in execution. It retains a high level of historic integrity with its
original fenestration and fabric largely intact. The house is a five-bay center-entrance building. It is a two-story side-gabled dwelling of post-and-beam
construction with cedar clapboard siding. The front entrance features a gabled
porch with a vaulted ceiling and sidelights composed of three vertical panes. The
doors and windows of are in strict symmetry. The front windows feature
twelve-over-twelve double-hung sashes, original shutter mounts and simple
surrounds. The farmhouse has flush raking eaves and five frieze windows across
the front.

The interior of
the Craver farmhouse contains graceful decorative ornament, including a hand-carved
wooden fireplace mantel featuring Federal detailing. Board and batten doors
with wrought iron hardware are featured in rooms throughout the home.  An open balustrade staircase leads to the
upper level, which features the original wide pine plank flooring. The walls
throughout the house are mostly plaster and contain lath, both sawed and
split.

The farmhouse
faces south, standing over a one-room deep hand-dug earth basement with a
bedrock floor. The house is supported by a stone-rubble foundation featuring
original hand-hewn beams. It stands on the north side of Craver Road, flanked
by a quarter-acre pond to the west, a large 19th-century heavy timber-frame,
English-style barn to the south and a producing apple orchard to the east.  An old stone fence runs in an east–west
direction on the northern boundary of the property.

The remnants of one
stone and mortar foundation are located about 100 feet east of the barn. There
are also remnants of a second stone-and-mortar foundation adjacent to the
farmhouse on its northern side which is believed to have once been the site of
the kitchen as separated from the main dwelling. The foundations are considered
unevaluated archeological resources.

Barn and stable 
The barn,
with its original slate roof and hand-hewn post and beam construction, is typical
English period design with center wagon doors and horizontal clapboarding.   It is a side-gabled form.  Its long side, or axis, is parallel to a
hill. Its appearance is of massiveness and simplicity, with heavy mortised,
tenoned and pegged beams. Resting on a stone foundation, the lower level
contains remnants of dairy and draft horse stalls, while the upper level appears
to have been used for hay storage.

Agricultural legacy 

The Craver Farmstead consists of rolling farmland and woodlands. Flora in evidence today
including apple trees, asparagus, rhubarb, and climbing roses are believed to
result of plantings by previous occupants from 100 to 225 years ago.

The apple orchard at the Craver Farmstead currently produces three varieties. New York State census
records from 1875 confirm that the Craver family had hundreds of apple and pear
trees in addition to other crops. The existing orchard consists of
approximately 30 producing trees and is the only surviving plot of fruit trees planted
by the Craver family more than 100 years ago.

Detailed History

Background 
Earliest
records of the Craver Farmstead indicate construction of the farmhouse sometime
prior to 1790.  The home appears on a
survey map drawn by Evert Van Alen. Whose comments included the farm being
"under good improvement" with a "sufficiency of
timber."  A lease of same farm, some
225 acres, called "This Indenture," was dated February 1, 1790.  The owner was patroon "Stephen Van
Rensselaer, Efquire, Proprietor  of the
Manor of Renffelaerwyck."  The
tenants were Johannes and Henrick Miller. 
On the reverse side of the lease appears a rent release dated December 14,
1863, to Peter Reynolds and John W. Craver.

The lease
itself carries historical significance. Alexander Hamilton, who was Stephen Van
Rensselaer's brother-in-law, designed a lease that bound the new tenants
permanently to the estate, thereby adroitly sidestepping the issue of
feudalism, which had been outlawed in New York State in 1782.  The 1790 “Indenture” which originally created
the Craver Farmstead, was such an agreement. Under the terms of the lease, the
tenant had to pay all taxes, and was to use the land for agricultural purposes
only. The patroon reserved to himself timber, water and mineral rights, and had
the right to enter the tenant's property to exploit those resources. The tenant
couldn't sell his property, but only the lease, to another.  If he wished to sell the "quarter sale
clause" restricted the tenant further, by Van Rensselaer having the option
of collecting one-fourth of the sale price or taking full title to the property
by paying three-quarters of the market price. 
In the 1790 lease The Millers agreed to a yearly rent of 24 1/2
skipples of winter wheat, four fat fowls, and one day's service with carriage and
horses, due on January first of each year.

By 1797 the
original leased property had been transferred to and divided into two 112.5
acre parcels by William and Henry Coon,
the Craver farmstead standing on the
William Coon portion.   On November 6, 1841, Elizabeth Craver, having inherited  the property 
from her late husband, William Coon, for consideration of $50, signed over her interest in the farm
to her son John W. Craver (she had been remarried to William Craver in 1799), whose family
owned the Craver farmstead longer than any other tenant or owner.

The Craver Years 
John W.
Craver was born in Rensselaer  County,
New York on March 6, 1801, and resided in the Craver farmhouse his entire
life.  By 1830 Craver, had married and together
with his wife Catharine, had two daughters, Almira and Emily, who grew up on
the Craver Farmstead.  By 1855, New York
State Census records indicate that Craver was the 54-year-old head of a six-member family.  On April 3, 1855, during
the first annual Clinton (now East Greenbush) Town Meeting, held at the home of
William R. DeFreest, Craver was elected as an "Overseer of the Poor".
Overseers  of the Poor were
responsible  for assisting  people in need, supervising  admissions to the Poor House, and
certifying  that freed slaves were
capable of caring for themselves.

By 1875,
Craver was a widower, 74 years old, and farmed 112 acres, 90 of which were
improved, 29 plowed, 24 pasture, and 20 meadow. 
Craver produced hay, oats, rye, corn and potatoes.  He cultivated 150 apple and 100 pear trees
(the descendants of which are in evidence today) and strawberries. He raised
livestock, including cattle, horses, poultry and pigs. Craver Farmstead produce
included butter, eggs, pork, and cider. 
In 1874, on only 90 acres of improved farmland, Craver had grown 16
acres of oats, 4 of Indian corn, 16 of winter rye, and 8 of potatoes, which
yielded 400 bushels of oats, 75 of corn, 190 of rye, and 750 of potatoes.  His 24 acres of pasture accounted for 50 tons
of hay. Additionally, 150 apple and 100 pear trees yielded 200 and 30 bushels
of fruit, respectively. Farm production included 500 pounds of butter, 400
gallons of milk, 1200 pounds of pork, 8 barrels of cider, and $15 worth of eggs
sold. Craver valued his farm at $12000, and the farmstead at $1500. Additional
children included Albus, Sylvester, Caroline, Catherine, and Elizabeth. Upon
John W. Craver's death on January IS, 1888, intestate, ownership of the Craver
farmstead was assumed by Albus, who, on March 6, 1896, passed the property on
to his son, Irwin Craver. On April 15, 1929, Irwin died, and willed the property
to his surviving wife, Cylvie A. Craver, who sold the Craver farmstead and
acreage in 1942.

The Craver Farmstead was accepted for listing on the National Register of Historic Places in 1996.

References

Bibliography of References

Anderson,
George Baker.  Landmarks of Rensselaer
County. D. Mason and Company, Syracuse, NY. 1897.

Auer,
Michael J.  "Twenty Preservation
Briefs-The Preservation of Historic Barns.II US Department of Interior. 1989.

Barnard,
Daniel D.  "The Anti-Rent Movement
and Outbreak in New York."  Located
at the New York State Library, Albany, NY.

Christman,
Henry.  Tin Horns and Calico. Hope Farm
Press, Cornwallville, NY.  1945.

Conway,
Martin D., Surrogate.  IIIndexto wills
and Letters of Administration." Wills 1780 to 12/1/1895 Letters 1794.
Located at the New York State Library.

Derbyshire,
Janet H.  "Bloomingrove Rural
Cemetery, North Greenbush, New York." Located at the New York State Library.

Ellis,
David M.  "Landlords and Farmers in
the Hudson Mohawk Region 1790–1850." 1946. Located at the New York State
Library.

Harris,
Lauretta P.  "Vital Records of the
Town of Schodack."  Gateway Press,
Baltimore, MD.  1970.

Hicks,
Stephanie. Our Yesterdays-A History of Rensselaer County.  Craib and Roderick Hull Craib.  1948.

History
of Sand Lake. Reprinted from "Sylvester's History of Rensselaer County 1880".
Everts and Peck, Philadelphia, PA. 1880.

Horowitz,
Lois. A Bibliography of Military Name Lists from Pre-1675 to 1900: A Guide to
Genealogical Sources. Scarecrow Printing, Metuchen, NJ.  1990.

The
Independent Newspaper, Chatham, NY. "Pathmasters, Fence Viewers Were
Earliest Town Officials."  By Kristin
Shaw. 5/15/95.

Kim,
Sung Bok.  Landlord and Tenant in
Colonial New York Manorial Society 1664–1775. University of North Carolina,
Press. 1978

Light,
Sally. House Histories.  Golden Hill
Press, Inc., Spencertown, NY 12165. 1989.

Map of
Historic Sites Town of East Greenbush 1855–1955. Located at the East Greenbush
Town Hall, 225 Columbia Turnpike, East Greenbush, NY 12061.

McClave,
Elizabeth W.  “StephenVan Rensselaer
III-A Pictorial Reflection and Biographical Commentary-The Good Patroon.II
Located at the East Greenbush Library, 225 Columbia Turnpike, East Greenbush, NY.

Murray,
David.        "The Anti-Rent Episode in
the State of New York." Located at the New York State Library.

New York
State Archives, 11th Floor, Cultural Education Center, Empire State Plaza,
Albany, NY. "Greenbush Surveys" 
(Circa 1700 survey maps) and "Van Rensselaer  Manor Papers"  (Leases).

Nissenson,
Samuel G. Library. "The Patroon's Domain."   Located at the New York State

O'Callagh2m,
E.B.  "Calendar of New York Colonial
Manuscripts1643-1803."   Located at
the New York State Library.

Pearson,
Jonathan. "Contributions for the Genealogies of the First Settlers of the Ancient
County of Albany From 1630–1800."  
Genealogical Publishing Co., Inc., Baltimore, MD.  1976.

Pepper,
Calvin, Jr. State Library. "Manor of Rensselaerwyck."    1846. 
Located at the New York State Library

Rensselaer  County Deed Books.  Rensselaer 
County Courthouse,  Troy, NY.

Rensselaer  County Weekly Review Newspaper,  501 Broadway, 
Troy, NY 12181.   "Board Approves  First Entries 
for Town Historic Register.” By Jim Akin, Staff Reporter. 7/23/1985.

Schuyler,
Montgomery. "The Patroons and Lords of Manors of the Hudson."  1932. Located at the NY State Library.

Weise,
A.J.  History of the Seventeen Towns of
Rensselaer County.  Reprinted by the
Rensselaer County American Revolution Bicentennial Commission 1975. Originally
published by J.M. Francis and Tucker, Troy, NY. 
1880.

Wicks,
David A. Abstract of Title of the Craver Farmhouse and Lands.  Located at the Patroon Abstract Corporation,
25 Second Street, Troy, NY 12180. 
11/7/80.

Church
Records

Bloomingrove  Reformed 
Dutch Church, North Greenbush, 
NY. East Greenbush  Dutch Reformed  Church, East Greenbush,  NY. First Evangelical  Lutheran 
Church, Rensselaerwyck,  NY.
Greenbush  Reformed  Church, Greenbush,  NY.

Reformed  Protestant 
Dutch Church, Greenbush,  NY. West
Sand Lake Lutheran  Church, West Sand
Lake, NY. Zion Evangelical  Lutheran  Church, Greenbush,  NY.

Houses on the National Register of Historic Places in New York (state)
Federal architecture in New York (state)
Houses completed in 1790
Houses in Rensselaer County, New York
National Register of Historic Places in Rensselaer County, New York